"Watch the Wind Blow By" is a song written by Anders Osborne and Dylan Altman, and recorded by American country music singer Tim McGraw. It was released in October 2003 as the fifth and final single from McGraw's 2002 album Tim McGraw and the Dancehall Doctors.  The song reached number one on the US Billboard Hot Country Singles & Tracks (now Hot Country Songs) for the week of March 20, 2004.  It also peaked at number 32 on the Billboard Hot 100.

Content
The narrator states that all he wants to do is relax with his lover and "watch the wind blow by."

Chart positions
"Watch the Wind Blow By" debuted at number 48 on the U.S. Billboard Hot Country Singles & Tracks for the chart week of November 1, 2003.

Year-end charts

References

2003 singles
Tim McGraw songs
Song recordings produced by Byron Gallimore
Song recordings produced by Tim McGraw
Curb Records singles
2002 songs